Irma Tam Soong (15 July 1912 – 11 January 2001) was a historian specializing in Hawaiian-Chinese history, and was notable for writing about her experiences during World War II in China during Japanese occupation. She founded the Hawaiʻi Chinese History Center.

She was a distant relative of Chinese leader Sun Yat-sen.

Early life and education
She was born and raised in Honolulu, Hawaii. Soong was raised in Honolulu's Chinatown by Cantonese-speaking parents. She loved to read as a child and later wrote poetry as a young woman. She had seven siblings: sisters Pina Lee, Fannie Ching, Janet Lee; and brothers Peter Tam, Paul Tam, James S.T. Tam and Edward S.T. Tam.

She attended the University of Hawaiʻi and graduated from Yenching University in Peking before receiving a master's degree in English literature from Mills College in Oakland, California.

Career
She married Norman Tet Fo Soong, a photo journalist and war correspondent. At the time of the Japanese invasion of Hong Kong, she escaped as a refugee with her infant son, Colin, to the war time capital of Nationalist China, Chungking. She returned to Los Angeles after a DC3 flight over the "hump", the Himalyas, to Bombay and then by freighter to Los Angeles.

Soong taught English at Hwa Nan College in Fuzhou, China, Pomona College in Claremont, California, and Kaimuki High School in Honolulu, Hawaii. She retired from teaching in 1970.

After retiring, Soong was the founder and executive director of the Hawaiʻi Chinese History Center (HCHC) in Honolulu, Hawaiʻi. She established the center on October 31, 1970 and incorporated it on March 17, 1971 with the help of the Chinese Chamber of Commerce and the United Chinese Society. The goals of the center are to stimulate interest and research about Hawaiian-Chinese history; assist and guide Chinese-Americans in Hawaiʻi to make their experiences available; and collect, inventory, record and preserve historical materials, documents and photographs related to the Chinese in Hawaiʻi.

Personal life
She is the mother of one son—Dr. Colin Soong—a physician in Carson City, Nevada. She also had two grandchildren: Tamara Thunder Soong and Andrew Soong. She also has four great-grandchildren: James Benjamin Soong, Ian Thunder, Avery Thunder, and Hannah Soong.

Soong died in 2001.

Published works
Soong devoted most of her life writing about her experiences during World War II in China during the Japanese occupation.

Proceeds of her war memoir went to Mills College, the Community Church of Honolulu and the Hawaiʻi Chinese History Center.

"Five Hsing Chung Hui Men of Valor" is a history of the revolutionary society founded in Hawaiʻi by Sun. The book was printed as part of the 200th anniversary commemoration of the arrival of Chinese in Hawaiʻi. 

Soong wrote the foreword of Tin-Yuke Char's autobiographical The Bamboo Path.

She wrote "Sun Yat-sen's Christian Schooling in Hawaiʻi" (1997) published in The Hawaiian Journal of History about Dr. Sun Yat-sen's four years as a sojourner in Hawaiʻi in 1879-1883 and his attendance at three Christian educational institutions.

References

1912 births
2001 deaths
20th-century American historians
Hawaiian studies
Writers from Honolulu
University of Hawaiʻi at Mānoa alumni
Yenching University alumni
Pomona College faculty
Mills College alumni
American women historians
Historians from California